Walter Waltham (fl. 1393–1397), of Wycombe, Buckinghamshire, was an English politician.

He was a Member (MP) of the Parliament of England for Wycombe in 1393 and January 1397.

References

Year of birth missing
Year of death missing
English MPs 1393
People from Buckinghamshire
English MPs January 1397